Mirages is the third studio album by Canadian electronic music musician Tim Hecker, released on September 21, 2004 on Alien8 Recordings. It is described on the Alien8 website as "an ambient-death-metal classic in waiting." The album is composed primarily of heavily distorted and processed guitar.

The track "The Truth of Accountants" is a reference to the philosophy of director Werner Herzog. It reaches a merely superficial truth, the truth of accountants.". Herzog continues to use this phrase to distance himself from the idea that facts create truth.

Track listing

Production notes
Recorded in Montreal and Ottawa from November 2002 – March 2004
Le Fly Pan Am + Christof Migone play on track 3
Oren Ambarchi plays guitar on track 9
David Bryant plays guitar on track 11
"Kaito" samples the recording of the number station "Magnetic Fields" off the Conet project, which contains a recording by Jean Michel Jarre

References

External links
Alien8 Recordings information page for Mirages

2004 albums
Tim Hecker albums
Alien8 Recordings albums